Standard was an Indian brand of automobile which was produced by Standard Motor Products of India Limited (SMPIL) in Madras from 1951 to 1988. Indian Standards were variations of vehicles made in the United Kingdom by Standard-Triumph. Standard Motor Products of India Ltd. (STAMPRO) was incorporated in 1948, a company formed by Union Company (Motors) Ltd. and the British Standard Motor Company. Their first product was the Standard Vanguard. The company was dissolved in 2006 and the old plant was torn down.

History
The first locally built Standard Vanguards were finished in 1951, built in Standard Motors' Vandalur (a suburb of Madras) factory.

From 1955, versions of the Standard Eight and Ten were produced, with ever-increasing local content. The Pennant joined in 1959, although it too was curiously branded "Standard 10" and devoid of bootlid trimwork. The Tens and later Heralds and Gazels all used versions of the 948 cc Standard-Triumph four-cylinder engine. In 1961 production began of the Triumph Herald, known as the Standard Herald in India.

Standard also built a range of light commercial vehicles based on the Standard Atlas/20 (later Leyland 20), called the Standard Twenty. They were sold with the advertising slogan "Standard Twenty can do plenty". For these, production of diesel engines began in India, later exported back to the UK for use in the refurbished Carbodies FX4Q London cabs. In spite of a production lineup incorporating passenger cars as well as light commercials, production was always low. In the fiscal year 1974/75, for instance, only 1,393 units were built. The Twenty was later updated with locally developed angular bodywork.

Annual production of passenger cars reached about 3,000 units in the early 1970s, but production dropped steadily throughout the decade and only 161 cars were finished in 1976. By 1980, production was down to six cars and thereafter the company reported annual outputs of single cars for many years, reportedly only carried out so as to keep the licence active.

Herald
Badged in the Indian market as the Standard Herald, the Herald was originally heavily dependent on British parts, but as these were gradually replaced by indigenous items specifications and trim as local content increased. By 1965 engines, gearboxes, and axles were all made in India. In 1966 the Standard Herald Mark II was introduced, which featured the bonnet and front end of the Vitesse, but strangely with the outer pair of headlights blocked off and the parking lights cum side-indicators incorporated there instead. In anticipation of the Mark III, very late Mk IIs featured modified rear bodywork (different roofline and a bootlid without a recess).

The new Standard Herald Mark III, made from 1968 to 1971, received a unique indigenously developed four-door body, to meet the demands of Indian buyers (with large families) and competition from the Ambassador and Fiat 1100 (both of which featured four doors). In 1969-1970 a very few Herald Mark III Companions were built, five-door estates with fibreglass roofs and tailgates. The "Companion" nameplate hearkens back to the Standard Ten-based Companion introduced in 1955.

Gazel

In 1972, the Standard Herald was remodeled (redesigned body, new suspension, and new differential) by Standard Motor Products of India as the Standard Gazel, with a different grille and headlights set far apart, purportedly inspired from the Triumph Herald 13/60. It received a new, more sober rear end with low horizontal rectangular tail-lights (which are also still used on some locally built buses and three-wheeled taxis in India) and without the characteristic tail-fins of the Herald designed by Michelotti. It also received a live rear-axle suspended on two leaf springs, purportedly copied from the Triumph Toledo instead of the Herald's swing-axle independent suspension, replacement of the Herald's front bucket seats with a bench, and underwent the retrograde move of replacing the shifter with a long-crank version as also found in the Standard Ten. However, the engine was the same 948 cc single carb. The Gazel was the first car to be remodelled and engineered in India.

The new Gazel continued in production in this guise until 1974, when a modified version took over. The updated model (Mark II) received a 'standard' bonnet, hinged at the rear, instead of the forward lifting front end inherited from the Herald. This move was most likely because the normal Herald bonnets popping open on either or both sides during running was a common occurrence, especially on rough roads. This, however, resulted in making the body heavier due to the additional reinforcement needed on the front panel due to the bonnet modification.

The Gazel was also built in small numbers with estate bodywork, the estate featuring a fiberglass tail-gate but with the saloon rear windscreen. Production of the Gazel ended in 1979 although another twelve cars were built in the 1980s, with a final, single car finished in 1983. It was not until the mid-1980s that Standard went into car production again, with the Standard 2000, a hand-me-down Rover SD1 with a local engine transplant.

Standard 2000

From 1985 to 1988 the company manufactured the Standard 2000, a version of the Rover SD1 powered by a  Standard four-cylinder engine borrowed from an old Standard Vanguard model (as also used in the Standard 20 commercial vehicle). Power was a mere  at 4,250 rpm. Standard had not been able to acquire a licence for the Rover SD1's more modern engines and thus had to rely on their existing technology. The 2000 featured higher ground clearance for the Indian market; but low quality, high price, and low performance combined to end the car after only about three years. Hopes had been high, with the Ministry of Industry claiming that the 2000 would be successful enough that the black market price of imported luxury cars would go down.

Production capacity was 4000 per year but such numbers were never achieved. Standard only built 11 cars in 1985 but 1,557 cars were finished in 1986.

To top it all, a supposedly false claim about the fuel average of the car attributed to the company from the then Government caused an inquiry and resulted in the company getting into long-winded legal tangles. India had recently introduced fuel-efficiency standards, which Standard Motors were unable to meet. The situation eventually led to the factory being shut down for many years until the property was auctioned off and thereafter completely torn down. Most, if not all, of the Rover SD1 parts were bought up by a British classic car parts specialist supplier named Rimmer Brothers in 2006 and shipped back to Britain.

Production
This table shows Standard's passenger car production. Some discrepancies are due to numbers being reported for the Indian financial year (1 April through 31 March), while occasionally numbers may signify a fifteen-month period (1 January through 31 March following year).

References

David Burgess Wise, The New Illustrated Encyclopedia of Automobiles.

External links
 A History of Standard Motor Products, Madras

Car manufacturers of India
Companies based in Chennai
Indian companies disestablished in 1988
Defunct motor vehicle manufacturers of India
Standard Motor Company
Indian companies established in 1947
Vehicle manufacturing companies disestablished in 1988
Vehicle manufacturing companies established in 1947